The Diocese of Algoma is a diocese of the Ecclesiastical Province of Ontario of the Anglican Church of Canada.  It comprises nearly 182,000 square kilometres of the Ontario districts of Algoma (from which it takes its name), Thunder Bay, Sudbury, Manitoulin, and parts of the districts of Nipissing and Timiskaming.  The diocese forms a wide band stretching from just west of Thunder Bay on the northern shore of Lake Superior east to the border of Ontario and Quebec.  Neighbouring Anglican dioceses are Rupert's Land to the west, Moosonee to the north, Ottawa to the east, and Ontario, Toronto, Huron to the south.

History 
The Diocese of Algoma, founded in 1873, was one of four carved off from the original Diocese of Toronto.  Consisting of a large First Nations population, the primary focus of the new diocese was intended to be missionary activity combined with ministry to the growing European settlements in the Muskoka and Parry Sound areas around Lake Huron.  By the turn of the twentieth century, the demographics of the territory had shifted considerably, as mining and forestry attracted more European settlement.  By 1906, Algoma ceased to be a missionary diocese of the ecclesiastical province and held its first independent synod.

The mission of the diocese is "To share in the gathering work of Christ so that His newness of life overflows into our hearts, homes, churches, and community."

Bishops of Algoma

Organization of the modern diocese
Algoma's See city is Sault Ste. Marie, and its Anglican population of 18,000 on the parish rolls is served by 50 parishes.  The current bishop of Algoma is Anne Germond. The current dean of Algoma and rector of St. Luke's Cathedral is James McShane.  Apart from Sault Ste. Marie, other major centres in the diocese include North Bay, Sudbury, and Thunder Bay.  Nineteen of the diocese's fifty parishes are located in these communities.  Most of the rest of the parishes are located in small towns and First Nations communities. The Diocese of Algoma is currently divided into five deaneries including: Algoma, Muskoka, Sudbury-Manitoulin, Temiskaming, and Thunder Bay-North Shore.

The diocese operates three camping ministries: Camp Gitchigomee located on Sandstone Lake near Thunder Bay; Camp Temiskaming on Fairy Lake, near New Liskeard; and Camp Manitou near Whitefish Falls.

The diocese maintains active chaplaincies at Thorneloe University located in Sudbury and the Mission to Seafarers, located in Thunder Bay.  The archival collection of the Anglican Diocese of Algoma is held at Algoma University in the Engracia de Jesus Matias Archives and Special Collections.

The dean of Algoma is also rector of St Luke's Cathedral, Sault Ste. Marie.

 1935–1940: Percy Alfred Paris
 1941–1944: William Lockridge Wright (Bishop of Algoma, 1944)
 1944–1951: James Hannington Craig
 1951–1957: Walter Bruce Jennings
 1957–1974: Frank Foley Nock (Bishop of Algoma, 1974)
 1975–1992: I. Lawrence Robertson
 1993–2001: Allan R. Reed (7th dean; Dean of Kootenay, 2001)
 2001–2007: Garry Dobinson
 2007–2010: Nelson Small
 2011–present: James McShane

Diocesan newspapers 
The first diocesan newspaper was established in the Algoma region in 1874 by the Rev. Edward Francis Wilson, the first principal of the Shingwauk Indian Residential School. This newspaper was first known as the Algoma Missionary News and was published out of the Shingwauk School.  In 1978 an Ojibway-language supplement to the Algoma Missionary News was published under the name The Peace Pipe with the tag line "an Ojibway newspaper published monthly at the Shingwauk Home".

Over the years the name of this paper changed a number of times and was known successively as Algoma Quarterly, The Algoma Missionary News and Shingwauk Journal, and finally Algoma Missionary News.  Publication of the Algoma Missionary News ceased in 1956.

In 1957, the newspaper was replaced by the Algoma Anglican, which is still in publication today.  The publisher of the Algoma Anglican is always the current bishop of Algoma, with the editor being assigned by the bishop. The newspaper has a mandate to share with the Algoma Anglican community about ongoing diocesan issues, news, and events.  The paper also includes updates about the numerous parishes within the Anglican Diocese of Algoma.

Editors of the numerous iterations of the newspaper have included:

References

External links
 Diocesan website
 Article on the diocese from the Anglican Journal
 Deanery of Thunder Bay website 
 Archive of the Algoma Missionary News (newspaper)
 Archive of the Algoma Anglican Newspaper
 The Algoma Liturgy, 1967 experimental liturgy

Religious organizations established in 1873
Algoma, Anglican Diocese of
Anglican Church in Ontario
Anglican dioceses established in the 19th century
Anglican bishops of Algoma
1873 establishments in Ontario
Anglican Province of Ontario